Rafael Pompeo Rodrigues Ledesma (born 31 December 1982), more commonly known as Gaúcho or Rafael Ledesma, is a Brazilian footballer.

He was signed by FBK Kaunas from Atlético Mineiro in summer 2006. After two seasons in FBK Kaunas he moved to Partizan Minsk in Belarus. In winter 2012 he moved back to Lithuania and played for Suduva. In 2013 Ledesma left Lithuania and signed with Ethnikos Achna in Cyprus.

In January 2019 he returned to Lithuania and became a member of FK Panevėžys. In 2019 he played 28 matches in A Lyga and scored 6 goals. After season he left FK Panevėžys.

Honours
Lithuanian Championship champion (2):
2006, 2007,
Lithuanian Championship Runners-up (2):
2008,
Lithuanian Cup winner (2)
2007–08Baltic League: Winner (1)
2008
Maltese Premier League: champion (1)
2015–16
Maltese FA Trophy: winner (1)
2014–15
Maltese Super Cup: winner (1)
2014

Individual

Best player of Lithuanian Championship 2007.
Top scorer in A Lyga: 2008 14 goals
Sūduva Marijampolė Player of the Year 2012

References

External links
 Brazilian FA Database
 

1982 births
Maltese Premier League players
Living people
Footballers from Porto Alegre
Brazilian footballers
Association football midfielders
Brazilian expatriate footballers
Expatriate footballers in Portugal
Expatriate footballers in Lithuania
Expatriate footballers in Belarus
Expatriate footballers in Cyprus
Expatriate footballers in Malta
Expatriate footballers in Latvia
Brazilian expatriate sportspeople in Portugal
Brazilian expatriate sportspeople in Lithuania
Brazilian expatriate sportspeople in Belarus
Brazilian expatriate sportspeople in Cyprus
Brazilian expatriate sportspeople in Malta
Brazilian expatriate sportspeople in Latvia
Cypriot First Division players
Esporte Clube Juventude players
CR Flamengo footballers
Associação Académica de Coimbra – O.A.F. players
C.F. Estrela da Amadora players
Clube Atlético Mineiro players
FBK Kaunas footballers
FC Partizan Minsk players
FC Dinamo Minsk players
FK Sūduva Marijampolė players
Ethnikos Achna FC players
Birkirkara F.C. players
Sliema Wanderers F.C. players
Valletta F.C. players
Gżira United F.C. players
FK Jelgava players
FC Vitebsk players
San Gwann F.C. players
FK Panevėžys players
Maltese Challenge League players